Abdullahi Shehu was the Director General of the Inter-Governmental Action Group against Money Laundering in West Africa between 2006 and 2014.

References

Living people
Nigerian civil servants
Date of birth missing (living people)
People from Plateau State
Alumni of the University of Hong Kong
Year of birth missing (living people)